Diocese of Cashel may refer to:
Roman Catholic Archdiocese of Cashel and Emly
Anglican Diocese of Cashel and Ossory and its predecessors